Zymic Demigod Lara Jaranilla (born 20 May 2004) is a Filipino actor.  
Jaranilla is a GMA Network contract artist. His first appearance in TV was May Bukas Pa which it broadcast on ABS-CBN, where he played as Junjun.

Personal life
Jaranilla is the youngest and the 3rd sibling within the Jaranilla family. He lives with his father, his grandmother, and his two older brothers. He is the brother of Zaijian Jaranilla which is a contract artist of Star Magic, the talent management agency of GMA Network's rival ABS-CBN.

Filmography

References

2004 births
Living people
Filipino male child actors
ABS-CBN personalities
TV5 (Philippine TV network) personalities
GMA Network personalities
People from Marinduque